Med Airways was a small Lebanese charter airline. It ceased all operations in 2015.

History and profile
It was named as Flying Carpet until 2009. Its fleet consisted of one Swearingen SA-227 Metro 19-seat turboprop airplane, one Piper PA-28, one Piper PA-32 and one Piper PA-34. In 2006 it received two Boeing 737-200 formerly owned by Southwest Airlines and Delta Air Lines and later received a Bombardier CRJ-200ER formerly owned by Independence Air. In 2009 the name was changed to Med Airways.

Destinations
Iraq
Baghdad - Baghdad International Airport
Basra - Basra International Airport
Erbil - Erbil International Airport
Sulaymaniyah - Sulaimaniyah International Airport
Lebanon
Beirut - Beirut Rafic Hariri International Airport Base
Sudan
Khartoum - Khartoum International Airport
Sweden
Stockholm - Arlanda Airport

Fleet

Current Fleet
The Med Airways fleet consists of the following aircraft (as of August 2017):
 1 Bombardier CRJ200ER

Former fleet
The airline fleet consisted of the following aircraft (as of December 2012):

2 Boeing 737-200
1 Bombardier CRJ-200ER
1 Swearingen SA-227 Metro
1 Piaggio P.180 Avanti
1 Piper PA-34 Seneca
1 Piper PA-32
1 Piper PA-28

References

External links
    Med Airways on Airliners.net
   Med Airways Fleet
Med Airways

Defunct airlines of Lebanon
Airlines established in 2000
Airlines disestablished in 2015
2000 establishments in Lebanon